Adjutant Charles Alfred Revol-Tissot was a French World War I flying ace credited with five aerial victories.

Biography

Charles Alfred Revol-Tissot was born on 2 June 1892 in Paris.

His youthful interest in aviation led him to learn to fly; he received Civil Pilot's Licence No. 1248 on 1 March 1913. When World War I began the following year, he ended up as a pilot in Escadrille BL.3. He was awarded the Médaille Militaire on 15 June 1915.

In 1916, he was transferred to Escadrille N.38 as a Nieuport fighter pilot. He survived a mid-air collision. Then he was transferred to the Eastern Front to fly for the Romanians as part of the French Military Mission, being assigned to Escadrila N.3. While flying for Romania, Tissot shot down 2 German aircraft and shared a third victory in 1917. 

On 14 February (other sources say 15 February), Adjutant Revol-Tissot shot down a German Albatros which crashed in flames near Diocheți. On 13 April, he shot down another German aircraft. Following this victory he was commissioned as an officer with the rank of Second Lieutenant.

On 16 April, during the afternoon, he attacked an Albatros with Corporal Maurice Théron, the enemy airplane crashing near Focșani. The victory was shared with Théron. His final score in Romania is 2 victories. 

In 1917, he returned to Escadrille N.38. He is also credited with prior victories during 1916, though details are unknown. After he became a flying ace, he was awarded the Legion d'honneur.

Charles Alfred Revol-Tissot died on 13 July 1971, location unknown.

Honors and awards

 Chevalier de la Légion d'Honneur
"Adjudant pilot, energetic and adroit, he knows that by his example of ardor and courage, the young pilots of his Escadrille will follow him. On 15 February 1917, he downed a German plane which crashed to the ground behind our lines." 

 Médaille Militaire
"Sergent pilot of the Army Air Service; pilot of the first order, courageous to the point of rashness, very close and very sure. Demonstrated his qualitites of courage and sang-froid on 26 March when, during a reconnaissance, his plane was very heavily fired upon and was hit several places by shrapnel, but he did not waver for an instant from the mission entrusted him. He particularly distinguished himself in the cooperation of his Escadrille during the operations of 5, 6 and 7 June."

 Virtutea Militară 2nd Class - while flying for Romania.

See also
 Maurice Gond - commander of Escadrila N.3

Notes

Sources of information

Reference
 Franks, Norman; Bailey, Frank (1993). Over the Front: The Complete Record of the Fighter Aces and Units of the United States and French Air Services, 1914–1918. London, UK: Grub Street Publishing. 

1892 births
1971 deaths
French World War I flying aces